Winston Trott (born 10 August 1944 in Bermuda) is a former Bermudian cricketer. He was a right-handed batsman and a left-arm medium-fast bowler. He played one first-class match for Bermuda, against New Zealand in 1972, taking four wickets in New Zealand's only innings. It was the maiden first-class match to be played by the Bermuda cricket team. He also represented Bermuda in the first two ICC Trophy tournaments.

References

External links
Cricket Archive profile
Cricinfo profile

1944 births
Living people
Bermudian cricketers